The 2017 Boston Pizza Cup was held from February 8 to 12 at the Rotary Spirit Centre in Westlock, Alberta.

Qualification process
Twelve teams qualified for the provincial tournament through several methods. The qualification process is as follows:

Notes
  The defending champion usually receives the first berth, however the defending champion from 2016, Kevin Koe, won the 2016 Tim Hortons Brier and therefore entered the 2017 Brier as Team Canada, negating any need for him to compete in the Boston Pizza Cup. In addition, 2015 Brier champion Pat Simmons, who had competed as Team Canada in 2015 and 2016 with the team Koe won the 2014 Boston Pizza Cup and Brier titles with, would also have been eligible for direct entry into the 2017 Boston Pizza Cup as a past provincial/national champion. However, Simmons' team disbanded after the 2015-16 curling season and forfeited their berth. Had Koe and Simmons both entered the 2017 Boston Pizza Cup, only one team would have qualified via the ACF bonspiel route. Instead, the next-ranked team on the CTRS was granted automatic entry.

Teams

Knockout Draw Brackets
The draw is listed as follows:https://web.archive.org/web/20170211081254/http://www.2017bostonpizzacup.com/default.aspx?p=draw

A Event

B Event

C Event

Playoffs

A vs. B
Saturday, February 11, 6:30 pm

C1 vs. C2
Saturday, February 11, 6:30 pm

Semifinal
Sunday, February 12, 11:00 am

Final
Sunday, February 12, 4:00 pm

References

https://web.archive.org/web/20170211081254/http://www.2017bostonpizzacup.com/default.aspx?p=draw
http://www.curlingzone.com/event.php?eventid=4351&eventtypeid=81&view=Main

External links

Curling in Alberta
2017 Tim Hortons Brier
Westlock County
Boston Pizza
February 2017 sports events in Canada